Juan Manuel González Mascías (born April 14, 1952) better known as Miki González, is a Spanish-Peruvian musician, composer, and producer born in  Madrid, Spain. He is recognized as a musical icon of the twentieth century in Peru, and his songs (such as "Akundún", "Dímelo, Dímelo" and "Vamos a Tocache") are frequently ranked among the best songs in Peruvian popular music.

Throughout his successful musical career, Miki became famous for being the pioneer in mixing rock with traditional Afro-Peruvian and Andean music.

He has collaborated with many artists, including: Mar de Copas, Narcosis, Charly García, Cementerio Club, Los Abuelos de la Nada, Andrés Calamaro, Jaime Cuadra, among others.

He studied and completed his musical training at the prestigious Berklee College of Music in Boston.

Discography 

 Puedes ser tú (1984)
 Tantas veces (1986)
 Nunca les creí (1987)
 Akundún (1992)
 Miki González (1995)
 González blues (1996)
 Mikongo y su kachanga (1998)
 Café Inkaterra (2004)
 Etno Tronics: Apu Sessions (2005)
 Inka Beats: Apu Sessions (2006)
 Inka Beats: Iskay (2006)
 Hi-Fi Stereo (2007)
 Landó por bulerías (2009)
 Caitro & Félix (2016)
 Perú Ethno Beats (2017)

See also 
 Peruvian rock

References

External links 

1952 births
21st-century Peruvian male singers
21st-century Peruvian singers
Spanish emigrants to Peru
20th-century Peruvian male singers
20th-century Peruvian singers
Living people
People from Madrid
Berklee College of Music alumni